Westlock is a town in Alberta, Canada. Westlock may also refer to:
Westlock Airport
Westlock County, a municipal district in Alberta, Canada
Westlock (Hnatko Farms) Aerodrome
Barrhead-Morinville-Westlock, a provincial electoral district
Westlock—St. Paul, a former federal electoral district
The Westlock Interlocking, a replacement for Solid State Interlocking manufactured by Westinghouse Rail Systems